Ricky He is a Canadian actor. He is known for his roles as Adam in the 2018 Disney Channel musical television film Freaky Friday and as Kenny Liu in the Epix horror series From.

Early life 
He was born in Vancouver, British Columbia, after his parents emigrated from China in the early 1990s. He attended a drama program in high school, and once graduated, enrolled at the University of British Columbia. After studying psychology for three years at UBC, he left university to pursue a career in acting.

Career 
He claimed in an interview that it was at a John Legend concert at Vancouver's Orpheum Theatre was where he knew he wanted to pursue performing, acting, and singing. On television, Ricky has appeared on The CW's The Flash, Fox's Wayward Pines, Freeform's Beyond, CBC's The Romeo Section, NBC's Trial & Error, ABC’s The Good Doctor and Syfy's The Magicians. He has also appeared in the television films Christmas Solo (2017), A Gift to Remember (2017), Looks like Christmas (2016), and Blurt (2018).

Filmography

Awards and nominations

References

External links
 

Living people
21st-century Canadian male actors
Male actors from Vancouver
Canadian male film actors
Canadian male television actors
Year of birth missing (living people)